Summer in the City may refer to:

 Summer in the City (film), 1970
 "Summer in the City" (song), 1966 song by The Lovin' Spoonful
 "Summer in the City", a song by Regina Spektor from the album Begin to Hope, 2006
 "Summer in the City", a 2017 song by Now United
 Summer in the City: Live in New York, a 2000 live album by Joe Jackson and Sheldon Steiger
 "Summer In The City", a music festival in Vilnius, Lithuania.

See also
 Hot Summer in the City, 1976 American adult film 
 Social in the City, a YouTube event formerly called Summer in the City
 Summer and the City, a young-adult novel written by Candace Bushnell